The Fokker D.XIV was a fighter aircraft developed in the Netherlands in the mid-1920s but which was only produced as a single prototype. It was a low-wing, cantilever monoplane with fixed tailskid undercarriage, the basic concept of which was derived from the Fokker V.25 that had been developed during World War I. The pilot sat in an open cockpit aft of the wing's trailing edge. Flight testing revealed excellent performance, but development was ceased when the prototype crashed, killing the test pilot.

Specifications

References

 
 
 Уголок неба

1920s Dutch fighter aircraft
D 14
Aircraft first flown in 1925